Nataliya Bilukha (born 22 January 1971) is a Ukrainian archer. She competed in the women's individual and team events at the 1996 Summer Olympics.

References

External links
 

1971 births
Living people
Ukrainian female archers
Olympic archers of Ukraine
Archers at the 1996 Summer Olympics
Sportspeople from Lviv